is a Japanese manga artist, notable for his manga series, The World God Only Knows.

Works

Other works
Wakaki collaborated on Team Ninja's Dead or Alive 5 Last Round to create some original costume designs for its characters.

References

External links
  

1972 births
Living people
Manga artists from Osaka Prefecture
People from Ikeda, Osaka